Ceraegidion dorrigoensis is a species of beetle in the family Cerambycidae. It was described by McKeown in 1937. It is known from Australia.

References

Parmenini
Beetles described in 1937